"I Get Around" is a song by Canadian electronic music band Dragonette from their debut studio album, Galore (2007). It was released on April 30, 2007 as the album's lead single. The track first appeared as an early working on Dragonette's self-released 2005 eponymous EP.

Track listings
CD single
"I Get Around" – 3:33
"Shockbox" – 4:03
"I Get Around" (Trophy Twins 24 Mix) – 7:13
"I Get Around" (music video)

Digital EP
"I Get Around" – 3:33
"Shockbox" – 4:03
"I Get Around" (Trophy Twins 24 Remix) – 7:13

Digital download – remixes
"I Get Around" (Midnight Juggernauts Remix) – 5:54
"I Get Around" (Oliver Koletski Remix) – 6:18
"I Get Around" (RTNY Remix) – 6:53
"I Get Around" (Van She Vocal) – 5:32
"I Get Around" (Van She Dub) – 5:33
"I Get Around" (Ratcliffe Remix) – 6:20
"I Get Around" (Ratcliffe 9AM Dub) – 6:54
"I Get Around" (Loose Cannons Dirty Toilet Sex Dub) – 8:25

7" colored vinyl
"I Get Around" (Van She Tech Dub Remix) – 5:33

12" picture disc
A1. "I Get Around" (Ratcliffe Mix) – 6:20
A2. "I Get Around" (Van She Tech Remix)
B1. "I Get Around" (RTNY Remix) – 6:53
B2. "I Get Around" (Trophy Twins 24 Mix) – 7:13

Credits and personnel
Credits adapted from the liner notes of Galore.

 Dragonette – production
 Martina Sorbara – vocals, songwriting
 Dan Kurtz – bass, guitar, keyboards, programming, songwriting
 Joel Stouffer – drums
 Simon Craig – guitar
 Dan Grech-Marguerat – mixing
 Ted Jensen – mastering
 Eric Ratz – drum recording

Charts

Release history

References

2007 songs
2007 debut singles
Dragonette songs
Mercury Records singles
Songs written by Dan Kurtz
Songs written by Martina Sorbara